Metamodernism is a term that refers to a range of developments observed in many areas of art, culture and philosophy, emerging in the aftermath of postmodernism, roughly at the turn of the 21st century. To many, it is characterized as mediations between aspects of modernism and postmodernism; for others the term suggests an integration of those sensibilities with premodern (indigenous and traditional) cultural codes as well. Metamodernism is one of a number of attempts to describe post-postmodernism.

History of the term 

In 1995, Canadian literary theorist Linda Hutcheon stated that a new label for what was coming after postmodernism was necessary.

Early usages
The term appeared as early as 1975, when scholar Mas'ud Zavarzadeh used it to describe a cluster of aesthetics or attitudes which had been emerging in American literary narratives since the mid-1950s.  In 1999, Moyo Okediji utilized the term "metamodern" applying it to contemporary African-American art that issues an "extension of and challenge to modernism and postmodernism." In 2002, Andre Furlani, analyzing the literary works of Guy Davenport, defined metamodernism as an aesthetic that is "after yet by means of modernism.... a departure as well as a perpetuation." The relationship between metamodernism and modernism was seen as going "far beyond homage, toward a reengagement with modernist method in order to address subject matter well outside the range or interest of the modernists themselves." In 2007, Alexandra Dumitrescu described metamodernism as partly a concurrence with, partly an emergence from, and partly a reaction to, postmodernism, "champion[ing] the idea that only in their interconnection and continuous revision lie the possibility of grasping the nature of contemporary cultural and literary phenomena."

Vermeulen and van den Akker
In 2010, cultural theorists Timotheus Vermeulen and Robin van den Akker contributed significantly to the theorization of post-postmodernism, using the term metamodernism.  In their essay Notes on Metamodernism, they asserted that the 2000s were characterized by the return of typically modern positions that nevertheless did not forfeit the postmodern mindsets of the 1980s and 1990s. According to them, the metamodern sensibility "can be conceived of as a kind of informed naivety, a pragmatic idealism", characteristic of cultural responses to recent global events such as climate change, the financial crisis, political instability, and the digital revolution. They asserted that “the postmodern culture of relativism, irony, and pastiche" is over, having been replaced by a post-ideological condition that stresses engagement, affect, and storytelling through "ironic sincerity."

Etymology
The prefix "meta-" refers to a reflective stance and repeated rumination, as opposed to Plato's metaxy, which denotes a movement between (meta) opposite poles as well as beyond (meta) them. Vermeulen and van den Akker described metamodernism as a "structure of feeling" that oscillates between modernism and postmodernism like "a pendulum swinging between...innumerable poles".

This oscillation has more recently been identified with hypermodernity. Metamodernity is the move beyond.  According to Kim Levin, writing in ARTnews, this oscillation "must embrace doubt, as well as hope and melancholy, sincerity and irony, affect and apathy, the personal and the political, and technology and techne." For the metamodern generation, according to Vermeulen, "grand narratives are as necessary as they are problematic, hope is not simply something to distrust, love not necessarily something to be ridiculed."

Vermeulen asserted that "metamodernism is not so much a philosophy—which implies a closed ontology—as it is an attempt at a vernacular, or...a sort of open source document, that might contextualise and explain what is going on around us, in political economy as much as in the arts." The return of a Romantic sensibility has been posited as a key characteristic of metamodernism, observed by Vermeulen and van den Akker in the architecture of Herzog & de Meuron, and the work of artists such as Bas Jan Ader, Peter Doig, Olafur Eliasson, Kaye Donachie, Charles Avery, and Ragnar Kjartansson.

Academic engagement since 2010

Metamodernism/metamodern theory has been engaged by scholars in numerous academic fields. 

James MacDowell, in his formulation of the "quirky" cinematic sensibility,  described the works of Wes Anderson, Michel Gondry, Spike Jonze, Miranda July, and Charlie Kaufman as building upon the "New Sincerity", and embodying the metamodern structure of feeling in their balancing of "ironic detachment with sincere engagement".

The 2013 issue of the American Book Review dedicated to metamodernism included a series of essays identifying authors such as Roberto Bolaño, Dave Eggers, Jonathan Franzen, Haruki Murakami, Zadie Smith, and David Foster Wallace as metamodernists. 

In 2013, Linda C. Ceriello proposed a theorization of metamodernism for the field of religious studies, connecting the contemporary phenomenon of secular spirituality to the emergence of a metamodern episteme. Her analysis of contemporary religious/spiritual movements and ontologies posits a shift that is consonant with the metamodern cultural sensibilities identified by others such as Vermeulen and van den Akker, and which has given rise to a distinct metamodern soteriology. 

Linda Ceriello's work with Greg Dember on popular cultural products such as Joss Whedon's seminal television show Buffy the Vampire Slayer and on Whedon and Goddard's 2012 film The Cabin in the Woods proposed an epistemic taxonomy of the monstrous/paranormal to distinguish the character of metamodern monsters from those which could be read as postmodern, modern or pre-modern. 

In a 2014 article in PMLA, literary scholars David James and Urmila Seshagiri argued that "metamodernist writing incorporates and adapts, reactivates and complicates the aesthetic prerogatives of an earlier cultural moment", in discussing twenty-first century writers such as Tom McCarthy.

In 2014, Professor Stephen Knudsen, writing in ArtPulse, noted that metamodernism "allows the possibility of staying sympathetic to the poststructuralist deconstruction of subjectivity and the self—Lyotard’s teasing of everything into intertextual fragments—and yet it still encourages genuine protagonists and creators and the recouping of some of modernism's virtues."

In 2017, Vermeulen and van den Akker, with Allison Gibbons, published Metamodernism: Historicity, Affect and Depth After Postmodernism, an edited collection of essays exploring the notion of metamodernism across a variety of fields in the arts and culture. Individual chapters cover metamodernism in areas such as film, literary fiction, crafts, television, photography and politics. Contributors include the three editors, James MacDowell, Josh Toth, Jöog Heiser, Sjoerd van Tuinen, Lee Konstantinou, Nicole Timmer, Gry C. Rustad, Kuy Hanno Schwind, Irmtraud Huber, Wolfgang Funk, Sam Browse, Raoul Eshelman, and James Elkins. In the introductory chapter, van den Akker and Vermeulen update and consolidate their original 2010 proposal, while addressing the divergent usages of the term “metamodernism” by other thinkers.

In a 2017 essay on metamodernism in literary fiction, Fabio Vittorini stated that since the late 1980s, memetic strategies of the modern have been combined with the meta-literary strategies of the postmodern, performing "a pendulum-like motion between the naive and/or fanatic idealism of the former and the skeptical and/or apathetic pragmatism of the latter."

The first peer-reviewed article applying metamodern theory to the study of religions was published in 2017 by Michel Clasquin-Johnson, 

Starting 2018 the UK Arts and Humanities Research Council (AHRC) has funded a Metamodernism Research Network. The Network has hosted several international symposia and conferences.In 2021, American philosopher Jason Josephson Storm published Metamodernism: The Future of Theory, a foundational theoretical text in metamodernist philosophy, social science, and politics. In this book, Storm establishes a novel method for critical scholarly research in the social sciences and humanities, disciplines which he refers to using the umbrella term "human sciences". The metamodernist mode of analysis involves metarealism, process social ontology, hylosemiotics, Zeteticism and a "revaluation of values", each of which is developed progressively in parts I-IV of the text. Storm's philosophy of metamodernism builds on and critiques both modernism and postmodernism, arguing that those two preceding movements are not as disparate as they have been made out to be. Ultimately, while incorporating modernist and postmodernist elements, Metamodernism foregrounds the importance of reflective, self-analytical, interdisciplinary scholarship. Storm asserts the need for a humble, positively and progressively oriented academy in which a collaborative and compassionate ethics serve openly as the motivation behind research and development of thought.

Metamodernism in the arts

Drawing upon the work of Vermeulen and van den Akker, Luke Turner published The Metamodernist Manifesto in 2011 as "an exercise in simultaneously defining and embodying the metamodern spirit," describing it as "a romantic reaction to our crisis-ridden moment." The manifesto recognized "oscillation to be the natural order of the world," and called for an end to "the inertia resulting from a century of modernist ideological naivety and the cynical insincerity of its antonymous bastard child." Instead, Turner proposed metamodernism as "the mercurial condition between and beyond irony and sincerity, naivety and knowingness, relativism and truth, optimism and doubt, in pursuit of a plurality of disparate and elusive horizons," and concluded with a call to "go forth and oscillate!" In 2014, the manifesto became the impetus for LaBeouf, Rönkkö & Turner's collaborative art practice, after Shia LaBeouf reached out to Turner after encountering the text, with the trio embarking on a series of metamodern performance projects exploring connection, empathy, and community across digital and physical platforms.

A number of exhibitions devoted to metamodernism have been staged. In November 2011, the Museum of Arts and Design in New York staged an exhibition entitled No More Modern: Notes on Metamodernism, featuring the work of Pilvi Takala, Guido van der Werve, Benjamin Martin, and Mariechen Danz. In March 2012, Galerie Tanja Wagner in Berlin curated Discussing Metamodernism in collaboration with Vermeulen and van den Akker. The show featured the work of Ulf Aminde, Yael Bartana, Monica Bonvicini, Mariechen Danz, Annabel Daou, Paula Doepfner, Olafur Eliasson, Mona Hatoum, Andy Holden, Sejla Kameric, Ragnar Kjartansson, Kris Lemsalu, Issa Sant, David Thorpe, Angelika J. Trojnarski, Luke Turner, and Nastja Säde Rönkkö. In 2013 Andy Holden staged the exhibition Maximum Irony! Maximum Sincerity 1999-2003: Towards a Unified Theory of M!MS. The exhibition examined the manifesto he had written in 2003 that called for art to be simultaneously ironic and sincere. The exhibition told the history of the writing of the manifesto and subsequently M!MS it now often cited as a precursor to Metamodernism as a ‘structure of feeling’.

In his fourth novel, More Deaths than One, published in 2014, the New Zealand writer and singer-songwriter Gary Jeshel Forrester examined metamodernism by way of a search for the Central Illinois roots of David Foster Wallace during a picaresque journey to America. In it, Forrester wrote that "[m]etamodernist theory proposes to fill the postmodernist void with a rough synthesis of the two predecessors from the twentieth century [modernism and post-modernism]. In the new paradigm, metaphysics, epistemology, and ontology all have their places, but the overriding concern is with yet another division of philosophy – ethics. It's okay to search for values and meaning, even as we continue to be skeptical."

In May 2014, country music artist Sturgill Simpson told CMT that his album Metamodern Sounds in Country Music had been inspired in part by an essay by Seth Abramson, who writes about metamodernism on his Huffington Post blog. Simpson stated that "Abramson homes in on the way everybody is obsessed with nostalgia, even though technology is moving faster than ever." According to J.T. Welsch, "Abramson sees the 'meta-' prefix as a means to transcend the burden of modernism and postmodernism's allegedly polarised intellectual heritage."

A strand of metamodernism can be identified in Sci-Fi, taking the place of Postmodernism. Denis Villeneuve's Arrival is seen by Pappis as an example, "in that it explores an oscillation in and transcendence of time".

Bo Burnham's Inside and Eighth Grade have been described as metamodern reactions to growing up with social media.

Developmental metamodernism

Other authors have utilized the term metamodernism in a sense that is partly related but divergent from the general academic conception and employment of the term as a cultural sensibility. These authors treat the concept as an aspirational stage in human development. Some have also related this conceptualization of metamodernism to Integral theory-- an earlier developmental paradigm with a spiritual emphasis.

Hanzi Freinacht and Nordic metamodernism 
In 2017, sociologist Daniel Görtz and theory artist Emil Ejner Friis, writing under the pen name Hanzi Freinacht, published the first volume in their 'Metamodern Guide to Politics' Series, The Listening Society. Employing metamodernism as their "philosophical engine," they construe metamodernism as an active intellectual, social, and political movement emerging to meet the crises arising from globalization. 

"Freinacht" articulates a progressive political program heavily informed by developmental psychology, particularly the Model of Hierarchical Complexity (MHC), a neo-Piagetian framework developed by Michael Commons. In this context, metamodernism is best understood not merely as a cultural phase, but as a developmental stage, which is manifested at both the individual and the collective levels. The distinct stages of the MHC thus correspond to cultural expressions of these stages and their associated worldviews, or "effective value memes."

In September 2018, Görtz conducted a TEDx talk in Berlin outlining the development of "value memes" (influenced by the work of Clare W. Graves and Don Beck) claiming that the metamodern value meme constitutes the highest form yet. 

In 2019, the second volume of the Series, Nordic Ideology, was published, providing Freinacht's detailed vision for a political metamodernism.

Jim Rutt brought metamodernism to the notice of the so-called "GameB" community through various interviews with Freinacht (Görtz), Stein, Cooper, and others on The Jim Rutt Show. On November 16, 2018, the topic of political metamodernism was broached on Revolutionary Left Radio hosted by Breht Ó Séaghdha, interviewing Austin Hayden Smidt, where they discuss the paradigmatic backdrops of modernity and postmodernity, and the need for leftist reform and unification which they suggest political metamodernism could guide. Douglas Lain of Zero Books has also explored the topic of political metamodernism on his podcast with Luke Turner.

Politics 
Swedish political party Initiativet is based on metamodern principles. It is a sister-party of Danish political party Alternativet.

Metamodernism and Bildung 
In 2019, Lene Rachel Anderson published the book Metamodernity: Meaning and Hope in a Complex World, in which she claims: "Metamodernity provides us with a framework for understanding ourselves and our societies in a much more complex way. It contains both indigenous, premodern, modern, and postmodern cultural elements and thus provides social norms and a moral fabric for intimacy, spirituality, religion, science, and self-exploration, all at the same time." 

2019 also saw the publication of The World We Create: From God to Market by Tomas Björkman, a work exploring the complex origins of our precarious situation today, along with a set of proposed solutions utilizing a metamodern framework.

In 2021, Perspectiva Press published Metamodernity: Dispatches from a Time Between Worlds, an anthology of essays on metamodernism and society by Jonathan Rowson and others.

Criticism 
Following interviews with Vermeulen and van den Akker and Daniel Görtz, philosopher and founder of Parallax magazine Tom Amarque criticized Metamodernism on a range of points. He states that the approaches of Metamodernism provide few insights into longstanding issues such as modern warfare. He has also accused its academic theoretical framework of being untranslatable to the working class. He also claims that the metamodern emphasis on sincerity would assign meaning to things like sentimental Hollywood clichès.

See also 

 David Foster Wallace
 Integral theory
 Kitsch movement
 New Sincerity
 Post-irony
 Post-postmodernism
 Reconstructivism
 Remodernism
 Slavic Native Faith and mono-ideologies
 Spiral Dynamics
 Eric Van Hove

References

External links 
 Notes on Metamodernism — (webzine founded by Vermeulen and van den Akker)
The Metamodernist Manifesto
 What is Metamodern? (blog)
 Metamoderna (blog)
After Postmodernism (YouTube video series)